David Parkes (17 May 1892 – 1975) was an English footballer who played in the Football League for Sheffield Wednesday, Rochdale and Stoke.

Career
Parkes was born in Lye and played for Newcastle Town and Brighton & Hove Albion before joining Sheffield Wednesday in 1914. He was a regular in the Wednesday side in 1914–15 as they achieved a 7th-place finish in the First Division. His career was interrupted by World War I and once League football had been resumed in 1919–20 Parkes had lost his place in the side. He left for Stoke in July 1920 however he failed to make much of an impact and after making just six appearances in 1920–21 he left for Welsh side Llanelly. He then moved to Rochdale where he spent six seasons making 219 appearances for the "Dale" before ending his career with Macclesfield.

Career statistics
Source:

References

1892 births
1975 deaths
English footballers
Association football midfielders
Newcastle Town F.C. players
Brighton & Hove Albion F.C. players
Sheffield Wednesday F.C. players
Stoke City F.C. players
Llanelli Town A.F.C. players
Rochdale A.F.C. players
Macclesfield Town F.C. players
English Football League players
Southern Football League players